Anne Dorte Michelsen (born 17 July 1958, Århus) is a Danish singer and composer. In Denmark she first became known as a member of the groups Tøsedrengene and Venter på Far. Outside Denmark her second solo record ("Næste Dans") sold well in Norway, Sweden and Japan. Her popularity in Japan was due to the song "Fortrolighed" which was a title song on a popular Japanese TV-show. The exotic Danish language and the longing melancholy mood apparently made a resonance with the Japanese audience.
As a leader, she released ten albums and published a book called Næste Dans.

Discography 
 Mellem Dig og Mig (1983)
 Næste Dans (1986)
 Alting Vender Tilbage (1987)
 Elskerindens Have (1989)
 Den Ordløse Time (1990)
 Min Karriere Som Kvinde (1992)
 Mørke Vande – Lyse Strande (2000)
 Fred hviler over land og by (2002)
 Så Stille Som Sne (2003)
 Hvor var det nu vi var? (2007)
 Hvis du vidste (2011)
 De voksnes rækker (2015)

Compilation albums 
 24 Hits (1988)
 De Store & De Stille (1998) 	
 Grænseløs Greatest (1999)

References

External links 
 http://www.annedortemichelsen.dk – Official site

1958 births
Living people
Danish women singers
Danish pop singers
People from Aarhus